Bishrampur  is a village development committee in Rautahat District in the Narayani Zone of south-eastern Nepal. At the time of the 1991 Nepal census it had a population of 6721 people living in 1229 individual households. Benauli is village which falls under this village. Now Bishrampur is a municipality named as Brindawan Municipality. The municipality consists of villages like Benauli, Ramauli, Bishrampur, Haraiya, Pipra, Harsaha, Bargajawa.

References

Populated places in Rautahat District